A list of buildings and structures in the Gambia:

Banjul
Banjul International Airport
African Heritage Museum
Albert Market
Arch 22
Gambia National Museum
National Library of The Gambia
Box Bar Stadium
State House of the Gambia
Royal Victoria Teaching Hospital

Bakau 
Kachikally Museum and Crocodile Pool
Independence Stadium

Brufut
Eden House
Hibiscus House Gambia

Janjanbureh
Senegambian stone circles

References
Accessgambia.com
Gambia.co.uk